The Kia Challenge is a TikTok trend linked to a series of motor vehicle thefts in 2022 targeting Kia and Hyundai vehicles in the United States and Australia. The thefts, mainly perpetrated by teenagers, have resulted in four deaths in the United States and a large increase in thefts of the affected car models.

Background
A video was posted on TikTok on July 12, 2022, where the author uses a USB connector on a naked key slot and successfully hotwires a car. This vulnerability exists on a type of ignition switch used in many Kia/Hyundai cars sold until 2021, which are not equipped with an immobilizer system.  The video was taken down on July 25.

Incidents

United States 
In Los Angeles, the trend has been linked to an 85% increase in thefts of Kia and Hyundai vehicles in 2022 compared to 2021. In Chicago, thefts of the affected vehicle models increased by over nine times, and children as young as 11 were reported to have participated in these thefts.

New York 
On October 23, 2022, six teenagers aged 14 to 19 stole a Kia Sportage in Buffalo, New York. Four of the teenagers were killed when they subsequently crashed the stolen car. The Buffalo Police Department linked the incident to the Kia Challenge.

Australia 
In Brisbane, two Kia cars were damaged by Kia Challenge participants in failed attempts to steal the vehicles.

Responses from involved companies 
TikTok has committed to removing pertinent videos uploaded by Kia Challenge thieves from the platform. Kia and Hyundai have both expressed awareness of the increased thefts of their vehicles, with Kia also noting that new vehicles starting with their 2022 model year now come with immobilizers installed.

Starting February 14, Hyundai introduced a free anti-theft software patch for some models of vehicle, and by June 23, 2023, all remaining eligible vehicles will have a patch that can be installed at a Hyundai dealership. Some models are unable to be upgraded, and instead customers will be reimbursed for steering wheel locks.

See also
 Devious lick, a 2021 internet challenge which encouraged participants to engage in theft of school property.

References

TikTok
October 2022 crimes in the United States
2022 crimes in Australia
Motor vehicle theft